Baramaricha Delwar Hossain High School is a high school in Cooch Behar district, West Bengal, India.  It is located in Sitalkuchi Block of Mathabhanga Sub-Division. The school is named in memory of Delwar Hossain, who was an assistant teacher at the school. It is a secondary school with Bengali as the medium of instruction.

External links 
School website

High schools and secondary schools in West Bengal
Schools in Cooch Behar district
Educational institutions in India with year of establishment missing